Pleasant Township is one of six townships in Switzerland County, Indiana, United States. As of the 2010 census, its population was 1,521 and it contained 610 housing units.

Geography

Unincorporated towns
 Aaron at 
 Avonburg at 
 Bennington at 
 Moorefield at 
 Pleasant at 
(This list is based on USGS data and may include former settlements.)

Adjacent townships
 Pike Township, Ohio County (northeast)
 Cotton Township (east)
 Jefferson Township (southeast)
 Craig Township (south)
 Milton Township, Jefferson County (southwest)
 Shelby Township, Jefferson County (west)
 Brown Township, Ripley County (northwest)

Cemeteries
The township contains these four cemeteries: Bear Creek, Pleasant Grove, Slawson and Union.

School districts
 Switzerland County School Corporation

Political districts
 Indiana's 6th congressional district
 State House District 68
 State Senate District 45

References
 United States Census Bureau 2008 TIGER/Line Shapefiles
 United States Board on Geographic Names (GNIS)
 IndianaMap

External links
 Indiana Township Association
 United Township Association of Indiana

Townships in Switzerland County, Indiana
Townships in Indiana